Voltaire is a 1933 American pre-Code biographical film directed by John G. Adolfi and starring George Arliss as the renowned 18th-century French writer and philosopher.

Plot
In pre-Revolutionary France, Voltaire champions the oppressed commoners and tries to warn King Louis XV (Reginald Owen) about the growing unrest among his subjects. The writer has a powerful ally in Madame Pompadour (Doris Kenyon), Louis' mistress, but the Count de Sarnac (Alan Mowbray) opposes him for his own ends.

When Voltaire pleads for the life of Calas, unjustly accused of treason, Louis is inclined to pardon the man, but Sarnac persuades him that it would be a sign of weakness, and Calas is swiftly executed. As a reward, Sarnac gains the wealthy man's estates.  Voltaire invites Calas' daughter and rightful heiress, Nanette (Margaret Lindsay), to shelter in his home.

Meanwhile, Sarnac tries to persuade the King that Voltaire is a traitor, citing his well-known friendship with Frederick the Great and claiming that it is he who is betraying French secrets to the Prussian ruler. Louis is not entirely convinced, but does banish Voltaire from his royal court at Versailles.

As a result, Madame Pompadour becomes reluctant to aid Voltaire further, until he arranges it so that she can overhear from Sarnac's own lips his ambition to replace her as Louis' paramount adviser. Then, she persuades the King to allow Voltaire to stage a new play at Versailles.

The production is a thinly disguised portrayal of Calas' execution and the aftermath transposed to an exotic setting. Voltaire hopes to open the King's eyes to his danger. Voltaire recruits Nanette to portray the part of herself. The King is sympathetic to the theatrical Nanette's plight, not recognizing himself as her despised oppressor until Sarnac points it out. Then Louis orders the play stopped before the explanatory final scene and orders that Voltaire be sent to the Bastille. However, hearing of a rich present given to Sarnac by Frederick, Voltaire unmasks the count as the real traitor. Sarnac is arrested, and Nanette's estates are restored to her.

Cast
George Arliss as Voltaire
Doris Kenyon as Madame Pompadour
Margaret Lindsay as Nanette Calas
Reginald Owen as King Louis XV
Theodore Newton as Francois, a friend of Nanette
Alan Mowbray as the Count de Sarnac
Gordon Westcott as the Captain
Murray Kinnell as Emile
Doris Lloyd as Madame Clarion
Douglass Dumbrille as Oriental King in Play
David Torrence as Dr. Tronchin, Voltaire's doctor
Heinie Conklin as	Protester (uncredited)

Box office
According to Warner Bros the film earned $393,000 domestically and $372,000 foreign.

Preservation status
The film is preserved in the Library of Congress collection. Though it has yet to be released on DVD, it does air occasionally on Turner Classic Movies.

References

External links
 
 
 

1933 films
American biographical drama films
American black-and-white films
Films set in the 18th century
Films set in France
Films based on American novels
Biographical films about philosophers
Films directed by John G. Adolfi
Cultural depictions of Louis XV
Cultural depictions of Madame de Pompadour
Cultural depictions of Voltaire
1930s biographical drama films
1930s historical films
American historical films
Warner Bros. films
1933 drama films
1930s English-language films
1930s American films
Films scored by Bernhard Kaun